Anavitória (Brazilian Portuguese: /ɐnɐviˈtɔɾjɐ/) is a Brazilian musical duo consisting of Ana Clara Caetano Costa and Vitória Fernandes Falcão. Formed in 2015, Anavitória debuted with an EP produced by Tiago Iorc after being discovered by Iorc's then manager Felipe Simas. They have released a total of four albums, two of which were nominated for Best Contemporary Pop Album at the Grammys. The duo have worked with multiple artists in the Brazilian music scene including Nando Reis and Rita Lee.

History

2014–2015
Both Caetano and Falcão studied in the same school in Araguaína, so they met and started recording covers for YouTube. One of the songs they recorded was "Um Dia Após o Outro" by Tiago Iorc and they sent it to the artist's manager Felipe Simas. So Iorc created the seal "Forasteiro" in partnership with his manager to launch outstanding artists. Iorc produced the duo's first EP that was released on April 2, 2015.

2016–present
After the success with the songs from the debut EP and the single "Singular", the duo launched a crowdfunding project for them released their debut album titled Anavitória. After the debut album the duo started their first tour through various cities in Brazil. Their song "Agora Eu Quero Ir" was featured in the soundtrack of Brazilian telenovela Malhação.

The duo's third studio album was released on November 29, 2019, titled N. The album consists of recordings of songs by Brazilian singer Nando Reis.

Personal Lives
Vitória has responded to speculation about her and Ana's sexualities by saying: "I am totally secure in my sexuality, and Ana in hers. We do not talk about whether we are straight or gay, we simply do not talk about that. The work that we have to deliver to the public is so huge! Why is it more important to know whom I kiss or whom I date?"

Ana e Vitória
On August 7, 2018, the film Ana e Vitória was released. The movie followed the beginning of the duo's relationship and the forming of their band. Ana and Vitória played the roles of themselves in the film. Ana e Vitória was directed by Matheus Souza.

Discography

Studio albums

Film

Awards and nominations

References

Indie folk groups
Tocantins
Brazilian musical duos
Musical groups established in 2013
Universal Music Group artists
2013 establishments in Brazil
Latin Grammy Award winners
Pop music duos
Folk music duos
Female musical duos
Women in Latin music